The Diamond Creek Football Club is an Australian rules football club located in Diamond Creek – an outer north-eastern suburb of Melbourne.

History
Formed in 1904, the club was a founding member of the Whittlesea District Football Association. A move to the Bourke-Evelyn Football League in 1906 was very successful with premierships in 1906 and 1908 and being runners-up in 1907 and 1912.

Nevertheless, Diamond Creek moved to the Heidelberg District Football League after World War I and, in 1922 joined Eltham, Greensborough, Kangaroo Ground, Templestowe and Warrandyte as founding members of the Diamond Valley Football League.

2005 Division 2 Premiership
Diamond Creek's last premiership was in 2005 in division 2 defeating Greensborough Football Club.

Current status
The club now plays in the Northern Football League, fielding 3 senior and 8 junior teams with a netball team in the Northern Football League Netball Comp. To go with this they also field a superules team for over 35s.

In 2009 Diamond Creek finished 2nd in division 2 after the home & away season, but lost both finals matches to finish 3rd overall

AFL/VFL players

Diamond Creek Football club has launched the careers of many AFL players including
 Gordon Coventry – champion Collingwood full forward
 Syd Coventry – Collingwood premiership captain and Brownlow Medallist
 Rhyce Shaw former Sydney player and former north melbourne coach
 Heath Shaw former Greater Western Sydney Giants player
 Jack Anthony former Collingwood and Fremantle player

Women's team
Diamond Creek had an affiliate women's team formed in 2002 with one team that expanded to two sides in 2007 (seniors and reserves) competing in the Victorian Women's Football League.

In 2009 it formed a Youth Girls side (U18s).

The Diamond Creek Women's Football Club affiliated as its own sporting body, officially separating from the Diamond Creek Football Club in 2009, and now plays out of Plenty Memorial Park.

Premierships
 2005 Division 3 defeating North Heidelberg
 2006 North West Division defeating Hadfield
 2012 Premier Division defeating Darebin

Currently the senior side competes in Premier Division in the VWFL and has competed in the Grand Final in 2009 & 2011.

Superules Team
In 2009 Diamond Creek for the 1st time fielded a Superules team

References

External links

 Diamond Creek Football Club Website
 Northern Football League Website

Northern Football League (Australia) clubs
Australian rules football clubs established in 1904
1904 establishments in Australia
Sport in the Shire of Nillumbik
Australian rules football clubs in Melbourne